Eutelia ablatrix is a moth of the family Noctuidae. It is found from Central America to Paraguay and on the Antilles.

References

Euteliinae
Moths of the Caribbean
Moths of Central America
Moths of South America
Moths of Cuba
Lepidoptera of Brazil
Lepidoptera of Jamaica
Moths described in 1852